Custom Killing is the fourth studio album by the Canadian speed/thrash metal band Razor. It was released in July 1987 by Toronto based label Fringe Product. It is more of an experimental approach and was fairly overlooked upon its release. It also features "Survival of the Fittest" and "Last Rites" which are the band's longest songs ever recorded. It is the final album to feature Mike Embro on drums and Mike Campagnolo on bass.

Track listing

Notes
 Re-issued in 2015 as a 12" limited edition colored vinyl by High Roller Records in gatefold 425gsm heavy cardboard sleeve, including a poster and lyric sheet. The 1st pressing is limited to 1,000 copies with the 2nd pressing being limited to 500 copies
 Re-issued in 2019 on CD by High Roller Records which contains a poster

Personnel 
 Stace McLaren - Vocals
 Dave Carlo - Guitars
 Mike Campagnolo - Bass
 Mike Embro - Drums

Production 
 Ed Bos - Logo
 Dana Marostega - Layout
 Terry Marostega - Engineering, Producer

References

External links 
 Official artist website

1987 albums
Razor (band) albums